Jessica Schilder (born 19 March 1999) is a Dutch athlete. She won the bronze medal in the women's shot put event at the 2022 World Athletics Indoor Championships held in Belgrade, Serbia. She competed in the women's shot put event at the 2021 European Athletics Indoor Championships. In August 2022 Schilder won the gold medal in shot put at the European Athletics Championships.

Personal bests
Outdoor
Shot put – 20.24 m (Munich 15 August 2022)
Indoor
Shot put -19.48 m (Belgrade 18 March 2022)

References

External links
 

1999 births
Living people
Dutch female shot putters
People from Volendam
Athletes (track and field) at the 2020 Summer Olympics
Olympic athletes of the Netherlands
World Athletics Indoor Championships medalists
20th-century Dutch women
20th-century Dutch people
21st-century Dutch women
Sportspeople from North Holland
European Athletics Championships winners